Néstor Rodríguez Lobaina is a Cuban democracy activist. He is the older brother of Rolando Rodríguez Lobaina.

He founded the Alternative Studies Center of the Cuban Youth for Democracy Movement. He was arrested in 1999 when he began a hunger strike in support of the Tamarindo 34 hunger strikers. He was arrested again in 2000 and sentenced to 6 years in prison. Amnesty International recognized him as a prisoner of conscience.

He was released in July 2005. He explained his gratitude to Amnesty International members who helped him.

References

Amnesty International prisoners of conscience held by Cuba
Cuban democracy activists
Cuban dissidents
Living people
Year of birth missing (living people)
Cuban prisoners and detainees